Vicq may refer to the following places in France:

 Vicq, Allier, a commune in the department of Allier
 Vicq, Haute-Marne, a commune in the department of Haute-Marne
 Vicq, Nord, a commune in the department of Nord
 Vicq, Yvelines, a commune in the department of Yvelines
 Vicq-d'Auribat, a commune in the department of Landes
 Vicq-Exemplet, a commune in the department of Indre
 Vicq-sur-Breuilh, a commune in the department of Haute-Vienne
 Vicq-sur-Gartempe, a commune in the department of Vienne
 Vicq-sur-Nahon, a commune in the department of Indre
 Pressignac-Vicq, a commune in the department of Dordogne

People
 Henri de Vicq, Lord of Meuleveldt; Flemish Ambassador.

Vicq is also the pseudonym for Raymond Antoine, Belgian comics artist and writer.